Byron, Indiana may refer to:

Byron, LaPorte County, Indiana, an unincorporated community in Kankakee Township
Byron, Parke County, Indiana, an unincorporated community in Howard Township